Long Yun (27 November 1884 – 27 June 1962) was governor and warlord of the Chinese province of Yunnan from 1927 to October 1945, when he was overthrown in a coup (known as "The Kunming Incident") by Du Yuming under the order of Chiang Kai-shek.

Early life 
Long Yun was an ethnic Yi, and a grandson of a tribal headman (tusi). His Yi name was Naji Niaoti (纳吉鸟梯) or Naji Jiajia (纳吉岬岬), while Long Yun was a Han Chinese name he adopted later. He was a cousin of Lu Han. 

Long Yun participated in the anti-Qing struggle in its early years. First he joined the local warlord's army in 1911 and was gradually promoted to the rank of corps commander. He served in Tang Jiyao's Yunnan Army for years until February 1927, when he, together with Hu Ruoyu, launched a coup and expelled Tang from office. Soon after that he became 38th Army commander in the National Revolutionary Army, at the same time continuing as Yunnan chairman for more than a decade.

Governor of Yunnan 

After the remarkable "26" coup, Tang Jiyao, then governor of Yunnan, was overthrown by Long Yun and his allies. Long Yun succeeded as the new governor and served as governor of Yunnan from 1928-45. When he was in power he put forward the goal of building a new Yunnan. He carried out a series of reorganizations and reforms from political, military, economic, cultural and educational aspects. During this period Yunnan was politically clear, had good social stability and a strong atmosphere of democracy. He consolidated and reorganized the economy, expanded paper money in the region and reorganized the tariff tax regulations. He prioritized textile export while reorganizing and developing production of tin ore, tungsten, antimonies, copper, salt, coal and other resources. Another big part of his project was the improvement of infrastructure, which was very poor in Yunnan. To improve it, he established a transportation enterprise that built the Yunnan-Burma Highway, the Diankang Road, the Sichuan-Yunnan West Road, the Yunnan-Sichuan Road, the Yunnan-Guangxi Highway and the Diankang Highway. He also paid much attention to the agricultural parts of Yunnan. He implemented measuring of land and later used the information they achieved to put through a reformed tax collection. He worked to expand grain farming, reduce tax revenue and strived to achieve food self-sufficiency for all farmers. Due to Long Yun's reforms, Kunming (capital of Yunnan) was commonly known as a "democratic fortress".

Second Sino-Japanese War 
He was nominated as commander-in-chief of the 1st Army Group, fighting against the Japanese in his province. 
The Second Sino-Japanese War (1937–45) brought progress and modernization to Yunnan, as the Nationalist government developed the province into a war base against the Japanese. Factories, universities and government agencies were transplanted there from the coastal regions, and fresh manpower, capital and ideas poured into the province. Industries were established and efforts made by the government to develop the resources of the region. The Burma Road made Yunnan the corridor through which supplies flowed to Allied bases in all parts of China, and Kunming became a key U.S. Air Force base. A major advance by the Japanese Army along the upper Salween River in 1942 was halted at Huitongqiao, near Tengchong, indicating the vital role that Yunnan played in the country’s defense.

The campaign involved Chinese troops, assisted by American forces, crossing the upper Salween on 11 May 1944 in order to drive Japanese forces from Yunnan into northern Burma. On 11 May about 40,000 Chinese of the Chinese Expeditionary Force crossed the Salween initially and a further 60,000 arrived later. About 17,000–19,000 Chinese and 15,000 Japanese were killed in the resulting battle. There were more Chinese casualties because the Japanese had time to prepare their fortifications on the south side of the river.

Post-war 
Immediately following the war, Generalissimo Chiang Kai-shek moved against Long Yun. When Chiang had retreated into western China, he was forced into an area barely under his control and hardly touched by the national revolution that had taken place after the fall of the Qing. Both of the two principal provinces of west China, Szechwan (pop.: 60 million) and Yunnan (pop.: 11 million), were dominated by old-style warlords. In 1941, Chiang had ousted the warlord of Sichuan. When Long Yun's turn came in 1945, he was caught by surprise: patriotically obeying Chiang's diversionary orders, a good part of his private army of over 100,000 men had marched far away, into Indochina.

Long Yun had been offered a face-saving job in Chungking earlier, but he had refused. The absence of his army, however, led to the final extraction. That night, 5 October 1945 ("the Kunming Incident"), rifles fired in Kunming and the next morning a score of bodies lay at the South Gate. For four days the battle continued as soldiers of Chiang Kai-shek's army assaulted the place. Only a few companies of Long's troops did any shooting; the warlord never had a chance.

On the fourth day Premier T.V. Soong flew down from Chungking. He and the Chinese commander in chief, Gen. Ho Ying-chin, had a morning conference with Gen. Long and that afternoon escorted him by air to Chungking. Gen. Lu Han, Long's former aide, took over the Yunnan government for the Generalissimo.

After being removed from his reign of 18 years, and his meaningless appointment to a position in Chungking, Long Yun escaped to Hong Kong at the end of 1948 and joined the Kuomintang Revolutionary Committee (KMT-RC), a KMT anti-Chiang organization. In August 1949 he declared his revolt against Chiang together with Huang Shaohong in Hong Kong. The KMT-RC ultimately became the largest "democratic party" under Communist Party rule after the founding of the People's Republic).

Return to Beijing 
Long Yun went back to Yunnan in 1950, after the establishment of the People's Republic. By inviting him back, the Communists were acting on the principle of the enemy of my enemy is my friend. Long Yun was not only reinstalled as Governor but awarded several high-ranking positions such as member of the Chinese People's Political Consultative Conference and the Standing Committee of the National People's Congress. He also became vice-chairman of the National Defense Committee and vice-chairman of the Administrative Council of Southwestern China. 

In 1956, he visited Eastern European countries such as the Soviet Union, Romania, Czechoslovakia, Yugoslavia and others.

Anti-Rightist movement
Later, during the Anti-Rightist Movement, Long Yun was labeled a rightist because of his criticism of Chinese foreign aid policy.  He maintained that if the living standard in the Soviet Union was so high that many ordinary workers could own their own car, then the responsibility for foreign aid should fall on the Soviet Union and not on China, since the Chinese economy was much less advanced than that of the Soviet Union because it was still recovering from wars.

Long Yun refused to change his view and openly complained of his treatment for telling the truth.  
Ultimately, on the day following his death in 1962, the Chinese government formally declared that he was not a rightist and was thus partially "rehabilitated". In July 1980, nearly two decades after his death, he was finally fully "rehabilitated" in accordance with the Chinese government's policy of admitting the Anti-Rightist Movement had been wrong.

References

Citations

Sources 

 陈贤庆 (Chen Xianqing), 民国军阀派系谈 (The Republic of China warlord cliques discussed), 2007 revised edition
 Generals from China: Long Yun
  Rulers; China; Long Yun
 Britannica
 Battle of Salween
 Brief History
  Loss of power
 Long Yun trapped

External links 
 

1884 births
1962 deaths
Republic of China warlords from Yunnan
Yi people
Governors of Yunnan
People from Zhaotong